Wanani (or Ouanani) is a town located on the island of Mohéli in the Comoros. In 2010, it had approximately 2,500 residents. It is located approximately 20 km from Fomboni and is known as "a banana, cassava and potato farming area".

References

Populated places in Mohéli